The Jabodebek LRT or Greater Jakarta LRT is a light rapid transit system currently under construction in Jakarta, the capital city of Indonesia, as well as the adjacent areas of West Java, within the Jakarta Metropolitan area. It is being implemented by the central government. To be directly operated by Kereta Api Indonesia (KAI) (rather than by its subsidiary KAI Commuter), the system is planned to connect the Jakarta city center with suburbs in Greater Jakarta such as Bogor, Depok and Bekasi, hence its acronym "Jabodebek".

Operation of the Jabodebek LRT was initially targeted to begin in 2019. However, the line has been hampered by numerous delays. It is now targeted to be operational by July 2023.

Background

The Jakarta light rapid transit project is aimed to tackle Jakarta's high road traffic congestion. The northern section of the LRT project partly replaces the Jakarta Monorail project which has been cancelled.

The monorail project in Jakarta was planned since the early 2000s. Construction commenced in 2004 but immediately stalled due to insufficient funding. In 2005 the initial pylons were constructed. However, the project was abandoned altogether in 2008, leaving the unfinished pylons blocking the main roads. The monorail line design, including the Green loop line and Blue line gained criticism as it only connected shopping malls in Jakarta's city center and would not connect to Jakarta's suburbs which desperately need transportation infrastructure, and thus would not be useful for Jakartan commuters. Transportation experts deemed that the city center monorail project would not address Jakarta's traffic problems, but would only serve as a novelty tourists' ride. To answer the need for commuter infrastructure, a consortium of five state owned enterprises, led by PT Adhi Karya (previously part of the Jakarta Monorail consortium), proposed the construction of a  monorail line connecting Cibubur-Cawang-Kuningan and Bekasi-Cawang across Greater Jakarta. The line will connect the 'Green' and 'Blue' lines originally planned by PT Jakarta Monorail to Jakarta's suburbs Cibubur and Bekasi.

In 2013, the Jakarta monorail project was revived and relaunched. In mid-2014 however, the project was stalled after a disagreement between PT Jakarta Monorel, the developer/operator, and the Jakarta Municipal Government over land acquisition for the depot as well as the station designs. Following the disagreements, by 2015 the Jakarta Municipal Government terminated its contract with PT Jakarta Monorel; thus monorail project was disbanded altogether. The numerous stalled monorail support poles will be used by state-owned construction company PT Adhi Karya to develop Jakarta's light rail transit instead. The shift of choice from monorail to a traditional rapid transit system was based on several considerations; compared to monorail, LRT has higher passenger capacity, simpler intersection and switching system, and cheaper maintenance cost.

Incidents
A collision of two set of trains occurred during testing phase on 25 October 2021 between Harjamukti station and Ciracas station. Neither train was occupied with passengers. As a result, the two trainsets involved in the collision were badly damaged, and the driver who was driving the train suffered minor injuries. The NTSC said that the cause of this incident was human error due to the engineer playing with a cellphone.

Lines

In 2015, it was announced that the Indonesian Cabinet Secretary has endorsed the plan to build three light rail transit lines. Total investment cost of this project is estimated to reach 23.8 trillion rupiah (1.8 billion US dollars). 

There are two lines on the system:
  Cibubur Line (Dukuh Atas–Harjamukti) (initially Cawang–Harjamukti)
 Station names: Dukuh Atas – Setiabudi – Rasuna Said – Kuningan – Pancoran – Cikoko – Ciliwung – Cawang – Taman Mini – Kampung Rambutan – Ciracas – Harjamukti
  Bekasi Line (Dukuh Atas–Jatimulya) (initially Cawang–Jatimulya)
 Station names: Dukuh Atas – Setiabudi – Rasuna Said – Kuningan – Pancoran – Cikoko – Ciliwung – Cawang – Jatibening Baru – Cikunir 1 – Cikunir 2 – Bekasi Barat – Bekasi Timur

Technically there are three line segments built (with Dukuh Atas – Cawang segment counted as a separate line), however only two lines would be operated.

The construction phase of extension for the planned route Grogol–Pesing–Rawa Buaya–Kamal Raya–Dadap–Soekarno–Hatta International Airport was proposed, but was not mentioned in the Presidential Regulation No. 98 of 2015 which sets the legal framework for state funding.

Phase 1
Phase 1 of the construction consists the entirety of Line 2 (Cawang–Bekasi Timur), part of Line 1 (Cibubur–Cawang–Baranangsiang) and Line 3 (Cawang-Dukuh Atas-Senayan). The first phase will cost 11.9 trillion rupiah (approx. USD 903.6 million).

 Phase 1A (Cibubur–Cawang–Dukuh Atas): 
 Phase 1B (Cawang–Bekasi Timur): 

Construction of Phase 1 began on 9 September 2015 and was initially predicted to be operational by early 2018, in time for the 2018 Asian Games. However, due to funding, restructuring and land acquisition issues, the project has failed to meet the deadline.

As of August 2021, construction progress has reached 86.57% (93.88% for Cibubur–Cawang, 86.87% for Cawang–Dukuh Atas and 91.58% for Cawang–Bekasi Timur).

Phase 2
Phase 2 will extend Line 1 southwards, from Cibubur to Bogor Baranangsiang, and also extending from the other end from Dukuh Atas to Palmerah and Senayan. It is currently in the planning stage.

See also

 Greater Jakarta Commuter Rail
 Jakarta LRT
 Jakarta MRT
 TransJakarta
 Transport in Jakarta

References

External links
 Adhi Karya:Jakarta LRT environmental impact assessment 
 Jakarta LRT Progress video per May 2018

Rapid transit in Indonesia
Transport in Jakarta
Transport in West Java
Proposed rail infrastructure in Indonesia
Light rail in Indonesia
Standard gauge railways in Indonesia